The Vol Xerpa ULM Pulsar is a Spanish ultralight aircraft produced by Vol Xerpa of Barcelona. The aircraft is supplied as a kit for amateur construction or as a complete ready-to-fly-aircraft.

Design and development
The Pulsar is a development of the conventional landing gear-equipped Kolb Firestar II and was designed to comply with the Fédération Aéronautique Internationale microlight rules. It features a strut-braced high-wing, a two-seats-in-side-by-side configuration enclosed or open cockpit, fixed tricycle landing gear with wheel pants and a single engine in tractor configuration.

The aircraft is made from bolted-together aluminum tubing, with its flying surfaces covered in doped aircraft fabric. The standard engine available is  the  Rotax 582 two-stroke powerplant.

The standard version has only a windshield, but a fully enclosed cockpit fairing is available.

Specifications (Pulsar)

References

External links

Official photos of the Pulsar

2000s Spanish ultralight aircraft
Homebuilt aircraft
Single-engined tractor aircraft